Faulty Superheroes is the twenty-first studio album by singer-songwriter Robert Pollard. It was released May 26, 2015, on Guided by Voices Inc.

Track listing 

 "What a Man"
 "Cafe of Elimination"
 "Faulty Superheroes"
 "Faster the Great"
 "The Real Wilderness"
 "Photo-Enforced Human Highway"
 "Take Me to Yolita"
 "Up Up and Up"
 "You Only Need One"
 "Bizarro's Last Quest"
 "Mozart's Throne"
 "Parakeet Vista"

References

External links 

2015 albums
Robert Pollard albums
Fire Records (UK) albums